Marco Martos Carrera (November 29, 1942 in Piura, Peru) is a Peruvian poet and the President of the Academia Peruana de la Lengua. It's assumed from critics to be one of the most important persons of the Peruvian "60's generation". Critics also appoints that he uses a simple way of expression with an ironic way to project the life. We can find in his work topics like 'loneliness' and 'existentialism'.

He received a PhD from the National University of San Marcos in Lima, became a professor there as well, and now is the Director of the Graduate School of Humanities.

He won in 1969, the Nacional Award of Poetry. His poetry had been translated and published in different languages: English, French, German, Italian and Spanish.

Works

Poetry

 Casa nuestra. (Our house) (Lima: Ediciones de la Rama Florida. 1965)
 Cuaderno de quejas y contentamientos. (Lima: CMB. 1969)
 Donde no se ama. (Lima: Milla Batres. 1974)
 Carpe diem. (Lima: Haraui. 1979)
 Carpe diem/El silbo de los aires amorosos. (Lima: CEPES. 1981)
 Muestra de arte rupestre. (Lima: Instituto Nacional de Cultura. 1990)
 Cabellera de Berenice. (Trujillo: SEA-Municipalidad Provincial de Trujillo-Casa del artista. 1991)
 Al leve reino. (Obra poética 1965-1996) (Lima: Peisa. 1996)
 El mar de las tinieblas. (Sea of shadows) (Lima: El Caballo Rojo-Atenea. 1999)
 Sílabas de la música. (Lima: LIRSUR. 2002)
 El monje de Praga. (Lima: Hipocampo. 2003)
 Jaque perpetuo. (Lima: Pontificia Universidad Católica del Perú. 2003)
 Dondoneo. (Lima: Universidad Nacional Mayor de San Marcos. 2004)
 Aunque es de noche. (Lima: Hipocampo. 2006)
 Poemario Dante y Virgilio. Iban oscuros en la profunda noche. (Lima: Universidad San Martín de Porres. 2008)

Research
Las palabras de Trilce (1989)

References

20th-century Peruvian poets
1942 births
Living people
National University of San Marcos alumni
Peruvian male poets
21st-century Peruvian poets
20th-century male writers
21st-century male writers